Yelena Potapenko (born 20 April 1993), also known as Olena Potapenko or Elena Potapenko, is a Ukraine-born Kazakhstani modern pentathlete.

She participated in the 2016 Summer Olympics and the 2018 Asian Games. She has qualified to represent Kazakhstan at the 2020 Summer Olympics.

References

External links 
 

1993 births
Living people
Sportspeople from Luhansk
Kazakhstani female modern pentathletes
Olympic modern pentathletes of Kazakhstan
Modern pentathletes at the 2016 Summer Olympics
Modern pentathletes at the 2020 Summer Olympics
Asian Games competitors for Kazakhstan
Modern pentathletes at the 2018 Asian Games
21st-century Kazakhstani women